Vincenzo Pellegrini (1575–1612) was an Italian painter of the late-Renaissance and Baroque periods, born at Perugia. He was a follower of Federico Barocci

References

1575 births
1612 deaths
People from Urbino
16th-century Italian painters
Italian male painters
17th-century Italian painters
Umbrian painters
Italian Renaissance painters